The 2008 E3 Prijs Vlaanderen was the 51st edition of the E3 Harelbeke cycle race and was held on 29 March 2008. The race started and finished in Harelbeke. The race was won by Kurt Asle Arvesen of the CSC team.

General classification

References

External links

2008 in Belgian sport
2008